RV2 may refer to:
 Mandala 2, the second mandala of the Rigveda
 Toyota RV-2, a concept car
 Red Victor 2, a heavily modified Vauxhall Victor
 RV2, an announced overhaul of the Roma Victor client
RV2- Ryan Villopoto, number 2 in motocross & super cross